Actinidain (actinidin, Actinidia anionic protease, proteinase A2 of Actinidia chinensis) is a type of cysteine protease enzyme found in fruits including kiwifruit (genus Actinidia), pineapple, mango, banana, figs, and papaya. This enzyme is part of the peptidase C1 family of papain-like proteases.

As a known allergen in kiwifruit, the enzyme is under preliminary research for its effect on tight junction proteins of intestinal epithelial cells.

Actinidain is commercially useful as a meat tenderiser and in coagulating milk for dairy products.

References

External links 
 The MEROPS online database for peptidases and their inhibitors: C01.007
 
 

EC 3.4.22

ja:アクチニジン